Kuladhar Saikia, is an ex officer of Indian Police Service who had retired in 2019 as Director General of Police at Guwahati has been involved in issues relating to Community Development and Community Policing. He was awarded President's police medals twice for his outstanding contribution to policing. He was the initiator and Nodal officer of Assam Police community empowerment initiative called “Project Prahari”. and one of the founders of Economic Policy Research group called Assam Prakalpa. He was awarded the prestigious Katha Award in 2000 and Sahitya Akademi Award in 2015 for his short stories. He was elected President of Asam Sahitya Sabha in January 2020.

Change Agent
A three-part case series had been published by Harvard Business Review titled, "Being a Change Agent" set in a rural district of Assam in India. It describes the efforts made by Kuladhar Saikia, then Deputy Inspector General of Police in the early 2000s, to tackle witchcraft-related crimes that were prevalent in this isolated and economically backward part of the country. Determined to end the social evil that still haunts rural and backward areas of Assam, Saikia's initiative and perseverance has resulted in raising awareness about the scourge of witchcraft that is often used bizarrely to settle personal scores and land disputes in villages.

Kuladhar Saikia initiated the project in 2001 by running campaigns involving village chiefs and elders, said the involvement of entire communities and the lack of evidence due to the fear of being ostracised had made the task of apprehending the culprits quite challenging. Project Prahari has brought together different stakeholders – student groups, science clubs, mahila samitis and other social activists on a common platform.

Awards and recognition
 Munin Borkotoky Award(1998)for "Akhorot Moi Aru Anyanya"(আখৰাত মই আৰু অন্যান্য), a collection of short stories 
 Kotha Award (2000) 
 Rashtrapati Arakhyi Award received twice
 Sahitya Academy Award (2015) for "Akashar Chhabi Aru Anyanya Galpa"

Asam Sahitya Sabha
Saikia is the president of Asam Sahitya Sabha and he has appealed on social media to contribute to the field of Assamese Wikipedia as well as various methods for the preservation of the Assamese language in digital plateform.This has helped many people to learn about the Assamese Wikipedia and many interested people to create accounts on Wikipedia.

References

Indian Police Service officers
Living people
1959 births
Director Generals of Assam police
Recipients of the Sahitya Akademi Award in Assamese